These are the records set in the Maharlika Pilipinas Basketball League (MPBL).

Individual single game records
Most points:
44 by  John Wilson (San Juan Knights) vs. Pampanga Giant Lanterns, September 17, 2019 at Angeles University Foundation Gymnasium, Angeles City
Most rebounds:
20 by  Gian Abrigo (Quezon City Capitals) vs. Parañaque Patriots, February 15, 2018 at Olivares College Gymnasium
Most assists:
20 by  Marwin Taywan (San Juan Knights) vs. Mindoro Tams, September 13, 2022 at Nueva Ecija Coliseum
Most steals:
11 by  Kyt Jimenez (Sarangani Marlins) vs. Mindoro Tams, October 10, 2022 at Muntinlupa Sports Complex
Most blocks:
8 by  Jayson Grimaldo (Batangas City Athletics) vs. Cebu City Sharks, July 15, 2019 at Valenzuela Astrodome

Team single game records
 Most points scored by a single team:
 146 by San Juan Knights vs. Mindoro Tams (64), September 13, 2022, at Nueva Ecija Coliseum
Biggest winning margin:
82 by San Juan Knights (146) vs. Mindoro Tams (64), September 13, 2022
Least points scored by a team in a quarter:
0 by Cebu City Sharks (19) vs. the Manila Stars on July 24, 2018
Least points scored by both teams:
75 by Davao Occidental Tigers (47) and Zamboanga Family's Brand Sardines (28), March 2, 2020 Game One of South Division Semifinals at Rizal Memorial College Gymnasium
Least points scored by both teams in a half:
30 by Davao Occidental Tigers (19) and Zamboanga Family's Brand Sardines (11), March 2, 2020

All-Star game records 
Correct after the 2020 MPBL All-Star Weekend was held:
 Most points scored by a team in a single game:
126 by Southern All-Stars vs. Northern All-Stars (122), February 13, 2020 at Mall of Asia Arena

References

Maharlika Pilipinas Basketball League
Maharlika Pilipinas Basketball League lists
Maharlika Pilipinas Basketball League lore